This is a list of electricity-generating power stations in the U.S. state of Hawaii, sorted by type and name. In 2020, Hawaii had a total summer capacity of 2,994 MW through all of its power plants, and a net generation of 9,079 GWh. The corresponding utility-scale electrical energy generation mix in 2021 was 65.4% petroleum-derived fuels, 11.8% coal, 7.3% wind, 5.6% solar, 3.7% non-biogenic waste, 3.1% biomass, and 1.2% hydroelectric.  Hawaii's one geothermal plant, which previously supplied about 2% of the state's and 10% of the Big Island's electricity, was offline during 2019 to repair damage from the 2018 lower Puna eruption. The plant came back online in late 2020, slowly ramping up to its full operational level.

Small-scale distributed solar including customer-owned photovoltaic panels delivered an additional 1,273 GWh to the six separate electrical grids serving Hawaii's major islands in 2021.  This was more than twice the amount generated by the state's utility-scale photovoltaic plants, and enabled solar energy to account for three-fifths of Hawaii's overall electricity generation by renewables. The state's renewable portfolio standard is the most ambitious in the U.S. at 30% of capacity by 2020, ramping to 100% by 2045. The large dependence on imported petroleum liquids contributes to Hawaii having the highest average retail electricity prices of any U.S. state.

Fossil-fuel power stations

Data from the U.S. Energy Information Administration serves as a general reference.

Coal 
Hawaii closed its last coal-fired power plant in September 2022.

Petroleum

 Campbell burned biomass liquids exclusively from 2011 to 2017 and shifted to primarily burn distillate fuel oil by 2019.
 Kapaia station's GE LM2500 gas turbine primarily burned jet fuel from its commissioning until 2008 and has since shifted to burn a mixture of other petroleum distillates.

Natural gas
Hawaii had no utility-scale power plants primarily fueled by fossil gas in 2019.

Renewable power stations
Data from the U.S. Energy Information Administration serves as a general reference.

Biomass and municipal waste

Geothermal

 The plant was shut down shortly after the start of the May 2018 lower Puna eruption.

Hydroelectric

Solar photovoltaic

Wind

Nuclear power stations
Hawaii had no utility-scale power plants fueled by fissile material in 2019

Battery storage facilities

 Battery storage power stations stabilize an electrical grid against fluctuations in solar and wind generation for periods extending from less than a minute to as long as several hours.

References

Energy in Hawaii
Lists of buildings and structures in Hawaii
Hawaii